Santa Banta Pvt. Ltd. is a 2016 Bollywood spy-comedy film directed by Akashdeep Sabir, produced by Viacom 18 and distributed by Viacom 18 and Cinetek Telefilms. The film features Vir Das, Boman Irani, Lisa Haydon and Neha Dhupia in leading roles.

Cast
 Vir Das as Banteshwar Singh Bollad/ Banta
 Boman Irani as Santheshwar Singh Sollad/ Santa
 Neha Dhupia as Kareena Roy / Biloo Kaur
 Lisa Haydon as Queenie "QT" Taneja
 Johnny Lever as Pushkar Nepali aka Chooza
 Ram Kapoor as Sonu Sultan
 Vijay Raaz as Arvind Dhariwal
 Sanjay Mishra as Akbar Allahbadi
 Ayub Khan as Shankar Roy, Indian High Commissioner and Kareena's husband

Production

The film was primarily shot in Fiji and Punjab.

On his film's association with Viacom 18, director Akashdeep said, "It’s very important to have a corporate firm that believes in you. At the end of the day, I don’t have an all-India network for the film’s release. Corporate firms guarantee a good release. Distribution of films is sheer commerce with no creative satisfaction".

Soundtrack
Singer Sonu Nigam has sung five songs in the film.
Track list

Controversy 
The Majority Sikh state of Punjab Banned the film for allegedly portraying the Sikh community in a mocking manner.

References

External links
 

2010s Hindi-language films
2016 films
Films set in Fiji
Viacom18 Studios films
Indian crime comedy films
Indian black comedy films
Indian spy comedy films